Crosthwait is a surname. Notable people with the surname include:

David Crosthwait (1898–1976), African-American mechanical and electrical engineer, inventor, and writer
Irwin Crosthwait (1914–1981), Canadian painter 
Joseph Crosthwait (1681–?), English astronomer